Journal for Research in Mathematics Education (JRME) is a peer-reviewed scientific journal within the field of mathematics education. The journal is published by the National Council of Teachers of Mathematics, and it appears five times a year (in January, March, May, July and November). The journal is paginated by volume.

JRME "is devoted to the interests of teachers of mathematics and mathematics education at all levels—preschool through adult", and different types of articles are welcome for submission, like "reports of research, including experiments, case studies, surveys, philosophical studies, and historical studies; articles about research, including literature reviews and theoretical analyses; brief reports of research; critiques of articles and books; and brief commentaries on issues pertaining to research".

JRME has been ranked by Journal Ranking as the most influential periodical in mathematics education research worldwide and the fourth most referenced educational research journal of any kind.

Editorial board
The editorial board, as of June 2018, consists of:

Editors:

Jinfa Cai, Editor, University of Delaware
Charles Hohensee, Associate Editor University of Delaware
Anne B. Morris, Associate Editor University of Delaware
Nerida F. Ellerton, Associate Editor Illinois State University
Randall Groth, Monograph Editor, Salisbury University
Sarah Theule Lubienski, Book Review Editor Indiana University

In April 2019, NCTM announced that the next editor of the journal will be Patricio Herbst, a professor of education and mathematics at the University of Michigan. The announcement did not include a date when Herbst will become editor.

See also
 List of scientific journals in mathematics education

References/Endnotes

External links
Journal web site

English-language journals
Mathematics education journals